The men's team competition at the 2006 Asian Games in Doha was held from 8 December to 11 December at the Doha Golf Club. The men played at 7181 yards with a par 72.

Schedule
All times are Arabia Standard Time (UTC+03:00)

Results

References 

Results
Results

Golf at the 2006 Asian Games